Yusup'Ali Wahaf (born 10 May 1999) is a Chinese footballer currently playing as a goalkeeper for Wuhan Three Towns.

Club career
Yusup'Ali Wahaf would play for the Xinjiang Tianshan Leopard youth team before being promoted to their senior team in the 2018 China League One season. He would make his debut in a league game on 18 March 2018 against Liaoning in a 2-0 defeat. He would be utilised as a reserve choice until he left the club to join third tier club Wuhan Three Towns on 5 August 2020. In his first season with the club he would go on to aid them in winning the division title and promotion into the second tier. This would be followed by another division title win and promotion as the club entered the top tier for the first tine in their history. The following campaign he would be part of the squad that won the 2022 Chinese Super League title.

Career statistics
.

Honours

Club
Wuhan Three Towns
Chinese Super League: 2022.
China League One: 2021
China League Two: 2020

References

External links 
 

1999 births
Living people
Footballers from Xinjiang
Uyghur sportspeople
Chinese footballers
China youth international footballers
Association football goalkeepers
China League One players
China League Two players
Xinjiang Tianshan Leopard F.C. players
Wuhan Three Towns F.C. players